Ghosts Of The Tsunami: Death and Life in Japan's Disaster Zone is a 2017 non-fiction book written by Richard Lloyd Parry, an English reporter who lived in Japan and reported about events there for years before the 2011 Japanese tsunami, in particular, the fatal decision-making leading to the drowning of the 74 students and 10 teachers of Okawa Elementary School (石巻市立大川小学校). In this book, Parry examines and recounts the devastating impact of the 2011 tsunami on Japanese survivors, communities and society at large, including years later. "It's a...chronicle of a disaster that, six years later, still seems incomprehensible."

Awards and honours

2018 Folio Prize

References

External links
Publisher's book website
on Google Books

2017 non-fiction books
Natural disasters in Japan
Books about the 2011 Tōhoku earthquake and tsunami
Books about nuclear issues
Jonathan Cape books